Good for the Soul is the second album from English singer Dionne Bromfield. It was released on 4 July 2011 in the United Kingdom. The album was preceded by the two singles, "Yeah Right" and "Foolin'".

Singles
Though not the lead single, "Good for the Soul" was released as a double a-side 7" vinyl promo with "Time Will Tell" on 5 January 2011.

"Yeah Right" was released as the album's lead single, which features Diggy Simmons. It was released on 21 February 2011, and peaked to number 36 on the UK Singles Chart.

"Foolin'" was released as the album's second single. The track features Lil Twist and was released on 17 June 2011. It did well in Bulgaria, reaching number eight in the top 40.

"Spinnin' for 2012", which features Tinchy Stryder, was released as the third single from the album on 23 September 2011. It will also serve as the official 2012 Summer Olympics torch relay theme song, as announced on 1 July 2011. The lyrics for the song, originally written and recorded by Speech Debelle, have been re-written by Tinchy and Bromfield.

A remix of "Ouch That Hurt", renamed "Ouch" and featuring Mz Bratt, was released as a promotional single for the 2011 film Demons Never Die on 17 October 2011. A music video was made to accompany the track, and it was directed by filmmaker Arjun Rose, who also wrote and directed the film.

"We've revamped the tune a bit as it's featuring in a new Brit horror film called Demons Never Die." - Bromfield.

Track listing

Chart performance

Release history

References

External links
 

2011 albums
Dionne Bromfield albums